Louis Gilavert (born 1 January 1998) is a French athlete specializing in the 3000 metres steeplechase.

He finished third in the junior race at the 2017 European Cross Country Championships behind winner Jakob Ingebrigtsen. He also finished third and behind Ingebrigtsen at the 2017 European Athletics U20 Championships.

As part of the French team for the delayed 2020 Summer Games in Tokyo, Gilavert finished twelfth in the third steeplechase heat.

References

External links
 

1998 births
Living people
French male steeplechase runners
Olympic athletes of France
Athletes (track and field) at the 2020 Summer Olympics